Mazin Elfadil Elsadig (born September 2, 1987) is an US-born Canadian actor of Sudanese heritage. He had a role in the 2007 Disney Channel Original Movie Jump In! and later joined the cast of the CTV/The N teen drama Degrassi: The Next Generation as Damian Hayes, for the show's sixth and seventh seasons, from 2006 to 2008. Elsadig also appeared on the stage play in Marcia Johnson's Late in 2008. He is also the voice of Broseph on the Teletoon animated series Stoked.

Filmography

References

External links

1987 births
Living people
21st-century Canadian male actors
American emigrants to Canada
American expatriates in Canada
Black Canadian male actors
Canadian male film actors
Canadian male television actors
Canadian male voice actors
Canadian people of Sudanese descent
Male actors from Chicago